Bithugalgama is a village in Balangoda town of Sabaragamuwa Province, Sri Lanka. It is 6 km away from Balangoda and 24 km away from Kalthota.

Populated places in Sabaragamuwa Province